Semenivka Raion can refer to:

 Semenivka Raion, Chernihiv Oblast, Ukraine
 Semenivka Raion, Poltava Oblast, Ukraine